Breakin' Combs is the debut studio album by American rapper and musician Dred Scott, released in 1994 on Tuff Break/A&M Records. The album was written and produced by Scott, with a sound that's influenced in the genres of soul, hip hop, jazz and reggae music. R&B/soul singer Adriana Evans is featured on the single "Check the Vibe", and "Swingin' from the Tree". Breakin' Combs was reissued in Japan twice, in 2005 and 2009, and includes bonus tracks on both editions.

Track listing

Notes
On the 2005 Japan deluxe edition, the bonus tracks is listed as, Track 1: "Remember the Love Rap" and Track 2: "Candy Man".

Personnel
Adrian Evans: Vocals [featuring] (Tracks 4, 9)
Dred Scott: Lead vocals, Vocals
Percy L. Chapman: Vocals (Track 7, 8)
Danny Grissett: Keyboards (Track 16) 
Osama Alfifi: Bass (Tracks 9, 16)
Rastine Calhoun: Saxophone (Tracks 1, 11, 16,), Flute (Tracks 2)
Darryl 'JMD' Moore: Drums (Tracks 16)
Big Domino: Backing vocals (Tracks 6, 15)
Andrew Padgett: Vocals [Voice DJ] (Tracks 2, 6, 10)
Shah Skills: Record Scratches (Track 1)

Credits
Executive-Producer – Evan "E-Man" Forster
Producer, Arranged By – Dred Scott
Mixed By – Eric Sarafin
Mixed By [Assistant] – Bryan Davis, Husky*
Mastered By - Brian Gardner
Producer, Arranged By – Dred Scott
Recorded By – Eric Sarafin (tracks: 2, 11), Greg "Mr. Sincere" Mull*
Recorded By [Assistant] – Andrew Padgett (tracks: 1, 3 to 10, 12 to 16)Charlie "The Wonder Boy" Essers*, Kevin Wright (tracks: 1, 3 to 10, 12 to 16)Victor McCoy (tracks: 1, 3 to 10, 12 to 16)

References

External links
 Dred Scott music
 Dred Scott Breakin' Combs' (CD Album)

1994 albums
2005 albums
2009 albums
A&M Records albums
Dred Scott (musician) albums
Songs written by Dred Scott (musician)
Albums produced by Dred Scott (musician)